William Henry Davies (born 7 August 1901, date of death unknown) was a Welsh cricketer. Davies was a right-handed batsman who bowled right-arm medium pace. He was born at Briton Ferry, Glamorgan.

Davies represented Glamorgan in 5 first-class matches between 1922 and 1927, making his debut against Leicestershire and playing his final first-class match against Leicestershire in 1927. In his 5 first-class matches he scored 33 runs at a batting average of 4.12 and took 3 wickets at a bowling average of 43.33.

References

External links
Bill Davies at Cricinfo
Bill Davies at CricketArchive

1901 births
Cricketers from Briton Ferry
Welsh cricketers
Glamorgan cricketers
Year of death missing